Santa Sabina (Italian and Spanish for Saint Sabina) may refer to :

 Santa Sabina, the minor basilica of Santa Sabina all'Aventino, a titular church for a cardinal-priest, also center of the Dominican order, in Rome, Italy
 Santa Sabina (band), a Mexican rock group from Guadalajara, Jalisco
 Santa Sabina College, a Roman Catholic Dominican school located in Sydney, Australia

See also 
 Sabina (disambiguation)
 Sabinus (disambiguation) 
 Sainte-Sabine (disambiguation) (French)